Warren Craney is the former head coach for York University's football team, the York Lions, a position he has held since the 2010. He has also been a coach for the Canada national football junior team, winning a gold medal as the team's defensive coordinator in 2012 and winning the championship as the team's head coach in 2016. Prior to his time with York, he was the defensive coordinator for the Concordia Stingers.

Personal life
Craney and his wife, Cara, have five children.

References

External links 
 York Lions bio

1968 births
Living people
People from Kirkland, Quebec
Concordia Stingers football coaches
York Lions football coaches